The Depot is the metro station of the Noida-Greater Noida Metro railway, in the city of Greater Noida in Uttar Pradesh, India. It was opened on 25 January 2019.

References

External links

Noida Metro stations
Railway stations in Gautam Buddh Nagar district
Transport in Noida